"Im Nin'alu" (English: If the gates are locked) is a Hebrew poem by 17th-century Rabbi Shalom Shabazi. It has been placed to music and sung by Israeli singer Ofra Haza and others. Haza first performed this song with the Shechunat Hatikva Workshop Theatre, appearing on television on IBA's General Television in 1978. The original version was included on the 1984 album Yemenite Songs, also known as Fifty Gates of Wisdom. The remixed version was part of her international debut Shaday of 1988.

"In Nin'alu" went on to become famous in Europe when a remixed version of the song, produced by Izhar Ashdot, reached the top 10 in many countries. The single reached number one in Finland, Norway, Spain, Switzerland and West Germany, where it stayed nine weeks atop the singles chart in mid-1988. In the United Kingdom, the track was a top-20 hit, peaking at number 15, and in the United States, it reached number 15 on Billboards Hot Dance Club Play chart and number 18 on the Modern Rock Tracks chart. The single reportedly sold some three million copies worldwide, making it one of the first world music recordings to extend over to mainstream pop chart success. London-based duo Coldcut produced a remix of Eric B. & Rakim's "Paid In Full", which heavily samples "Im Nin'alu".

Even though Haza's version of the song shows her own interpretation, and its reception was present-day and popular, it still fits in with the Yemenite tradition that she represented. In 1997, Haza re-recorded the track for her eponymous album Ofra Haza, produced by Frank Peterson of Enigma and Gregorian. The German promo 12-inch for the album's lead single "Show Me" also featured two remixes of "Im Nin'Alu". And in 2008 two new remixes were included on the greatest hits compilation Forever Ofra Haza – Her Greatest Songs Remixed.

The international follow-up single to "Im Nin'Alu (Played In Full)" in 1988 was a remix of the track "Galbi", also originally from the Yemenite Songs album.

Poem "Im Nin'alu"
The poem begins with the words

Official versions and remixes
1984
 Original recording, Yemenite Songs album a.k.a. Traditional Version - 5:18

1988
 Shaday Album Mix (Played In Full 7" Mix - English Vocal - Edited) - 3:29
 Played In Full Edit (Ariola Records 7", West Germany) - 3:53
 Played In Full 7" Mix - 4:05
 Played In Full 7" Mix - English Vocal - 4:05
 Played In Full - 7" Yemen Vocal (Teldec 7", West Germany) - 4:50
 Played In Full Mix (12") - 5:45
 Instrumental Dub (U.S. 12") - 5:49
 Extended Mix (12") - 6:40
 Gates of Heaven Mix (Mark Kamins and Frank Inglese, U.S. 12") - 6:54

1997 
 "Im Nin'alu 2000" - 1997 re-recording, album Ofra Haza - 3:38
 1997 Re-Recording - Ofra Goes To Hollywood Mix ("Show Me" Promo 12", Germany) - 5:15
 1997 Re-Recording - Some Skunk Funk Remix ("Show Me" Promo 12", Germany) - 7:30

2008
 2008 Version, album Forever Ofra Haza - Her Greatest Songs Remixed
 Unplugged Mix, album Forever Ofra Haza - Her Greatest Songs Remixed
 Bridge Mix, album Forever Ofra Haza - Her Greatest Songs Remixed
 Brixxton Squad Mix, album Forever Ofra Haza - Her Greatest Songs Remixed

Charts

Weekly charts

Year-end charts

Certifications

Samples and other versions
The song was prominently sampled in the chorus of the 'Seven Minutes of Madness' remix of the rap duo Eric B. & Rakim's 1987 single "Paid In Full" and Snoop Dogg used the same sample on his re-recorded version of "Paid In Full" titled "Paper'd Up" from his album Paid tha Cost to Be da Bo$$.

Canadian band Delerium sample the lyrics in their song "Hidden Mask", from the 1989 album Faces, Forms & Illusions.

American rap group Public Enemy also sampled the opening few seconds of the song (which are a cappella) on the track "Can't Truss It", featured on the 1991 album Apocalypse '91...The Enemy Strikes Black.

In 1998 Swedish DJ team C&N Project included a sample of the opening line "Im nin'alu" on their single "The Queen of Tel Aviv", which was credited to C&N Project Featuring Ofra Haza.

Israeli singer Michal Cohen performs "Im Nin'alu" on La Kahena (2005) by DJ Cheb i Sabbah.

In the album Confessions on a Dance Floor and in The Confessions Tour by Madonna (2007) the track "Isaac" includes a portion of the poem.

"Im Nin'alu" is the opening track on Eliyahu & The Qadim Ensemble's album Eastern Wind (2009), with lead vocals by Rachel Valfer.

In 2009 Panjabi MC remixed this song on his album named Indian Timing.

In 2012, Jazz quartet Third World Love performed a version of Im Nin'alu on their album Songs and Portraits.

In 2014, Ishay Ribo released a version of the song on his debut album.

In 2018 the song was recorded by Israeli pop artist Harel Skaat.

In 2021, the song was recorded by Israeli singer Narkis.

References

External links
 "Im Ninalu" by Aharon Amram
 Full text of the original poem in Hebrew

1984 songs
1987 singles
1988 singles
Ariola Records singles
European Hot 100 Singles number-one singles
Number-one singles in Germany
Number-one singles in Greece
Number-one singles in Norway
Number-one singles in Finland
Number-one singles in Portugal
Number-one singles in Spain
Number-one singles in Switzerland
Yemeni songs
Ofra Haza songs